= Near Ruin =

British metalcore band

- Origin: Maidstone, Kent, England
- Genres: Metalcore
- Years active: 2005-2009; 2010-2016
- Past members: Marcus Kidner; Simon Beck; Luke Knight; Lewis Archer; Tim Morgan; Jack "Rufus" Sibley; Martin Turner

Near Ruin were a four piece metalcore band from Maidstone, United Kingdom.

In August 2014, they released debut album No End. Eighteen months later in February 2016, the band released "Praying For Nothing", with an accompanying music video.

In June 2016 the band announced on their Facebook page that they had disbanded.

== Discography ==
=== Singles and EPs ===
| Title | Release date |
|---|---|
| Rebirth (EP) | 2010 |
| "Praying For Nothing" (single) | 2016 |

=== Albums ===
| Title | Release date |
|---|---|
| No End | 22 August 2014 |

=== Music videos ===
| Song | Release date |
|---|---|
| "No End" | 2014 |
| "Praying For Nothing" | 2016 |

== Members ==
=== Recent ===
Prior to their disbanding in June 2016, the line-up of Near Ruin consisted of Marcus Kidner on lead vocals and guitar, Simon Beck on keys and guitars, Luke Knight on bass guitar, and Lewis Archer on drums. Tim Morgan, the band's longest serving drummer, performed drum duties until his departure in 2015.

=== Past ===
Marcus Kidner – lead vocals, guitar (2005–2016)
Simon Beck – keys, guitar, vocals (2005–2016)
Luke Knight – bass guitar, vocals (2005–2016)
Lewis Archer – drums, vocals (2009–2010, 2015–2016)
Tim Morgan – drums (2010–2015)
Jack "Rufus" Sibley – drums (2008–2009)
Martin Turner – drums (2007–2008)
